The Botswana Saving Bank Employees' Union (BSEU) is a trade union affiliate of the Botswana Federation of Trade Unions in Botswana.

References

Botswana Federation of Trade Unions
Finance sector trade unions
Organisations based in Gaborone
Trade unions in Botswana